{{Infobox person
| name                = Norma Varden
| image               = Norma Varden in Five Minutes to Live (1961).jpg
| image_size          = 
| caption             = Varden in Five Minutes to Live (1961)
| birth_name          = Norma Varden Shackleton
| birth_date          = 
| birth_place         = London, England
| death_date          = 
| death_place         = Santa Barbara, California, U.S.
| alma_mater          = Guildhall School of Music and Drama 
| known_for           = The Sound of MusicCasablanca| resting_place       = Santa Barbara Cemetery
| other_names         = Norma Varden Shackleton
| occupation          = Actress
| years_active        = 1920–1969
}}

Norma Varden Shackleton (20 January 1898 – 19 January 1989), known professionally as Norma Varden, was an English-American actress with a long film career.

Life and career

Early life
Born in London, the daughter of a retired sea captain, Varden was a child prodigy. She trained as a concert pianist in Paris and performed in England before deciding to take up acting. She studied at the Guildhall School of Music and Drama and made her first appearance as Mrs Darling in Peter Pan.

Theatre career
In England, Varden was a protege of actress Kate Rorke. She acted in repertory theatre and made her West End debut in The Wandering Jew in 1920. From Shakespeare to farce, she established herself as a regular member of the Aldwych Theatre company where she appeared in plays from 1929 to 1933. She began to appear in British films, usually in haughty upper-class roles.

Move to America and film career
Varden's English film roles led to offers from Hollywood, and she moved there at the start of World War II, beginning a long career of playing character and supporting roles. Notable films Varden appeared in include Casablanca (1942), The Major and the Minor (1942), The White Cliffs of Dover (1944), National Velvet (1944), The Green Years (1946), Forever Amber (1947), Strangers on a Train (1951), Gentlemen Prefer Blondes (1953), Jupiter's Darling (1955), and Witness for the Prosecution (1957).  She played the housekeeper Frau Schmidt in The Sound of Music (1965). Two years later, she had a minor part as Lady Petherington in Doctor Dolittle (1967).

Television career
She had a recurring role in the 1960s NBC sitcom Hazel as Harriet Johnson. She appeared on CBS's I Love Lucy as Mrs. Benson, the neighbour with whom the Ricardos switch apartments after the birth of Little Ricky in 1953. In 1957, she guest-starred as Mrs. Weddington-Brown in Mr. Adams and Eve episode "The Social Crowd." She was cast as Mrs. Murdock in the 1961 episode "The Swedish Girl" on ABC's The Real McCoys. She appeared on CBS's Perry Mason as Winifred Wileen in the 1964 episode, "The Case of the Illicit Illusion". That same year, Varden, along with veteran character actress and comedienne Kathleen Freeman were featured in a third season episode of The Lucy Show entitled "Lucy Gets Her Maid". In that installment, Varden played yet another snooty socialite named Mrs. Van Vlack who hires Lucy Carmichael (Lucille Ball) as a maid. She also appeared on the seventh-season episode of The Beverly Hillbillies "Problem Bear" as the snobby socialite, Mrs. Vanransenhoff, who went home with Granny to get gossip on Mrs. Drysdale.
Varden played Mrs. Dumont in a 1966 (Season 3, Ep.11) episode of Bewitched entitled "Oedipus Hex", sitting on a "Ways & Means" charity committee with Samantha Stephens to raise funds for a children's playground.
Varden played Mrs. Hermione Monteagle in episode 13 of the Batman series of the 1960s.

Personal life
She became a naturalised United States citizen on 28 January 1949.

Varden died of heart failure in Santa Barbara, California, on the day before her 91st birthday. She never married.

Complete filmography

 The Glorious Adventure (1922) as Court Lady (uncredited)
 The Chance of a Night Time (1931) as Mrs. Rashley-Butcher (uncredited)
 A Night Like This (1932) as Mrs. Tuckett (uncredited)
 Crime on the Hill (1933) as Editor's Secretary (uncredited)
 Happy (1933) as Miss Stone, Secretary with Glasses (uncredited)
 Turkey Time (1933) as Ernestine Stoatt
 Evergreen (1934) as Barmaid (uncredited)
 The Iron Duke (1934) as Duchess of Richmond
 Dirty Work (1934) as Tiara Customer (uncredited)
 The Student's Romance (1935) as Dora Streudelmeier, Karl's Aunt
 Boys Will Be Boys (1935) as Lady Dorking
 Stormy Weather (1935) as Mrs. Dulcie Bullock
 Foreign Affaires (1935) as Mrs. Hardy Hornett
 Get Off My Foot (1935) as Mrs. Rawlingcourt
 Music Hath Charms (1935) as Bit (uncredited)
 The Amazing Quest of Ernest Bliss (1936) (uncredited)
 Where There's a Will (1936) as Lady Margaret Wimpleton
 East Meets West (1936) as Lady Mallory
 Windbag the Sailor (1936) as Olivia Potter-Porter
 Fire Over England (1937) as Elena's Governess (uncredited)
 Wanted! (1937) as Mrs. Smithers
 The Lilac Domino (1937) (uncredited)
 Strange Adventures of Mr. Smith (1937) as Mrs. Broadbent
 Make-Up (1937) as Hostess
 Rhythm Racketeer (1937) as Della Nash
 Fools for Scandal (1938) as Cicely Trevel (uncredited)
 You're the Doctor (1938) as Lady Beatrice
 Everything Happens to Me (1938) as Mrs. Prodder
 Little Ladyship (1939, TV Movie) as Mrs. Cynthia Bigley
 Home from Home (1939) as Mrs. Fairweather
 Shipyard Sally (1939) as Lady Patricia Randall
 The Earl of Chicago (1940) as Maureen Kilmount
 Waterloo Bridge (1940) as Hostess at Restaurant (uncredited)
 Hit Parade of 1941 (1940) (uncredited)
 The Mad Doctor (1940) as Minor Role (uncredited)
 Scotland Yard (1941) as Lady Heathcote
 Road to Zanzibar (1941) as Clara Kimble (uncredited)
 Glamour Boy (1941) as Mrs. Lee
 We Were Dancing (1942) as Mrs. Bryce-Carew
 Flying with Music (1942) as Miss Mullens
 The Glass Key (1942) as Henrys' Dinner Guest (uncredited)
 The Major and the Minor (1942) as Mrs. Osborne
 Casablanca (1942) as Wife of Pickpocketed Englishman (uncredited)
 Random Harvest (1942) as Julia
 Johnny Doughboy (1942) as Miss Penticott (uncredited)
 Slightly Dangerous (1943) as Opera Singer (uncredited)
 Dixie (1943) as Mrs. LaPlant (uncredited)
 The Good Fellows (1943) as Mrs. Drayton
 Sherlock Holmes Faces Death (1943) as Gracie, Barmaid (uncredited)
 My Kingdom for a Cook (1943) as Margaret, Morley's Cook (uncredited)
 The Beautiful Cheat (1943) as Miss Timmons
 The White Cliffs of Dover (1944) as Mrs. Bland
 Mademoiselle Fifi (1944) as The Wholesaler's Wife
 National Velvet (1944) as Miss Sims
 Bring on the Girls (1945) as Aunt Martha
 Those Endearing Young Charms (1945) as Mrs. Woods, Hall's Floor Lady
 The Cheaters (1945) as Mattie (uncredited)
 Girls of the Big House (1945) as Mrs. Thelma Holt
 Hold That Blonde (1945) as Flora Carteret
 The Green Years (1946) as Mrs. Bosomley
 The Searching Wind (1946) as Mrs. Hayworth
 Millie's Daughter (1947) as Mrs. Sarah Harris
 The Trouble with Women (1947) as Mrs. Wilmer Dawson
 Ivy (1947) as Joan Rodney (uncredited)
 Thunder in the Valley (1947) as Lady Eleanor (uncredited)
 Forever Amber (1947) as Mrs. Abbott (uncredited)
 Where There's Life (1947) as Mabel Jones
 Mr. Ashton Was Indiscreet (1947) as Woman at Banquet (uncredited)
 My Own True Love (1948) as Red Cross Nurse (uncredited)
 The Amazing Mr. X (1948) as Wealthy-Looking Woman (uncredited)
 The Scar (1948) as Mrs. Gerry (uncredited)
 Let's Live a Little (1948) as Nurse Brady
 Adventure in Baltimore (1949) as H. H. Hamilton
 The Secret Garden (1949) as Nurse
 Fancy Pants (1950) as Lady Maude
 Strangers on a Train (1951) as Mrs. Cunningham
 Thunder on the Hill (1951) as Pierce
 The Highwayman (1951) as Dowager at Ball (uncredited)
 Washington Story (1952) (uncredited)
 Les Miserables (1952) as Madame Courbet (uncredited)
 Something for the Birds (1952) as Congresswoman Bates (uncredited)
 Young Bess (1953) as Lady Tyrwhitt
 Loose in London (1953) as Aunt Agatha
 Gentlemen Prefer Blondes (1953) as Lady Beekman
 Elephant Walk (1954) as Shop Customer (uncredited)
 Three Coins in the Fountain (1954) as Woman at Cocktail Party (uncredited)
 Dynamite, the Story of Alfred Nobel (1954, TV Movie)
 The Silver Chalice (1954) as Roman Matron (uncredited)
 Jupiter's Darling (1955) as Fabia
 The Birds and the Bees (1956) as Passenger (uncredited)
 Witness for the Prosecution (1957) as Mrs. Emily Jane French
 In the Money (1958) as Mrs. Smythe-Chumley (uncredited)
 The Buccaneer (1958) as Madame Hilaire
 The Miracle (1959) as Mrs. MacGregor (uncredited)
 Five Minutes to Live (1961) as Priscilla Auerbach
 Rome Adventure (1962) as Dean of Briarcroft College for Women (uncredited)
 13 Frightened Girls (1963) as Miss Pittford
 Island of Love (1963) as Wife in Nightclub (uncredited) 
 Kisses for My President (1964) as Miss Dinsendorff (uncredited)
 The Sound of Music (1965) as Frau Schmidt, housekeeper
 A Very Special Favor (1965) as Mother Plum
 Two's Company (1965, TV Movie) as Lady Ordering Drink at Party (uncredited)
 Doctor Dolittle (1967) as Lady Petherington
 The Impossible Years (1968) as Dr. Jenkins (uncredited)
  (1968, TV Movie) as Englishwoman
 Doc (1969, TV Movie) as Mrs. Dobson (final film role)

References

External links

 
 
 
 
 
 Norma Varden obituary, New York Times, January 22, 1989

1898 births
1989 deaths
Alumni of the Guildhall School of Music and Drama
Actresses from London
American television actresses
American stage actresses
American film actresses
English television actresses
English stage actresses
English film actresses
British emigrants to the United States
20th-century American actresses
20th-century English actresses
Burials at Santa Barbara Cemetery